Norm Hiscock is a Canadian screenwriter, producer and director. He is known for his work on Saturday Night Live, King of the Hill, The Kids in the Hall, Corner Gas, Parks and Recreation, Brooklyn Nine-Nine and most recently as an executive producer on People of Earth, Trailer Park Boys: The Animated Series and Space Force. He was also a writer on The Kids in the Hall film, Kids in the Hall: Brain Candy.

King of the Hill written episodes
 "Propane Boom"
 "And They Call It Bobby Love"
 "Peggy's Pageant Fever"
 "As Old as the Hills"
 "To Kill a Ladybird"
 "Old Glory"
 "The Buck Stops Here"
 "Bobby Goes Nuts"
 "The Bluegrass Is Always Greener"
 "Dances with Dogs"
 "Flirting with the Master"

Parks and Recreation written episodes
 "Rock Show"
 "Pawnee Zoo"
 "Woman of the Year"
 "Flu Season"
 "Jerry's Painting"
 "Ron and Tammys"
 "Sweet Sixteen"
 "Soda Tax"
 "Emergency Response"
"Jerry's Retirement"

Brooklyn Nine-Nine written episodes
 "The Tagger"
 "Full Boyle"
 "Pontiac Bandit"
 "Payback"

References

External links

Year of birth missing (living people)
Canadian television writers
Writers from Montreal
Living people